A  jack-o'-lantern is a decoratively carved and internally lit pumpkin or turnip. associated with Halloween

Jack-o'-lantern may also refer to:

Customs and folklore
 In English folklore, jack-o'-lantern is an alternative term for will-o'-the-wisp or ignis fatuus, an unearthly light which attracts travellers
 In Irish folklore, jack-o'-lantern is an alternative term for Stingy Jack, also known as the Smith or Drunk Jack

Arts, entertainment, and media

Fictional entities
 Jack O'Lantern (DC Comics), several DC Comics superheroes
 Jack O'Lantern (Marvel Comics), several Marvel Comics supervillains
 Pyro Jack, sometimes called Jack O'Lantern, a demon found in the series of games Shin Megami Tensei

Other arts, entertainment, and media
 Jack O'Lantern (novel), a 1929 thriller novel by George Goodchild
 Jack O'Lantern (film), a 2004 film
 Dartmouth Jack-O-Lantern, a magazine

Other uses
Omphalotus olearius mushroom, commonly known as the jack-o-lantern mushroom